Lake Ulken Shabakty (Ülken Şabaqty) is a lake in the Burabay District, North Kazakhstan Region, Kazakhstan.  Fishery on the lake is common. 

The lake lies by Burabay spa town, in the Shchuchinsk-Borovoye resort zone. It is part of the Burabay National Park, a protected area. 

"Ulken Shabakty" means "Big Fish" in the Kazakh language ( "Ulken" - big; "Shabakty " - fish).

Description  
Ulken Shabakty is part of the Kokshetau Lakes, Kokshetau Hills, Kazakh Uplands. It is located to the north of lake Burabay. There are a number of islands in the lake. The lake basin is of tectonic origin, with granite rocks lining certain stretches of the shore.

See also
List of lakes of Kazakhstan

References 

Ulken Shabakty
Kazakh Uplands